Apple Universal Access is a component of the macOS operating system that provides computing abilities to people with visual impairment, hearing impairment, or physical disability.

Components 
Universal Access is a preference pane of the System Preferences application. It includes four sub-components, each providing different options and settings.

Seeing 
 Turn On/Off Screen Zooming
 Inverse Colors (White on Black, also known as reverse colors), +++8
 Set Display to Greyscale (10.2 onwards)
 Enhance Contrast
 Enable Access for Assistive Devices
 Enable Text-To-Speech for Universal Access Preferences
 Disable unnecessary automatic animations

Hearing 
 Flash the screen when an alert sound occurs
 Raise/Lower Volume

Keyboard 
 Sticky Keys (Treat a sequence of modifier keys as a key combo)
 Slow keys (Delay between key press and key acceptance)

Mouse 
 Mouse Keys (Use the numeric keypad in place of the mouse)
 Mouse Pointer Delay
 Mouse Pointer Max Speed
 Mouse Pointer enlarging

External links
 Universal Access Webpage
 Apple Accessibility webpage with more information

MacOS